Eguavoen is a surname. Notable people with the surname include:

Augustine Eguavoen (born 1965), Nigerian footballer and manager
Samuel Eguavoen (born 1993), America-born player of Canadian football